"Watching You" is a song co-written and recorded by American country music artist Rodney Atkins.  It was released in September 2006 as the second single from the album If You're Going Through Hell. The single became his second number-one single on the Billboard U.S. Hot Country Songs chart. It was named the number-one song of 2007 on Billboard's year-end chart. The song was written by Atkins, Steve Dean, and Brian Gene White.

Background and writing
The song was inspired by Atkins's son, Elijah. After having found out that Elijah had been singing Atkins's 2006 hit "If You're Going Through Hell (Before the Devil Even Knows)" to his teachers, he then had to explain to his son that it "might not be appropriate for him to be singing that in school."

Content
The song is a moderate up-tempo portraying two examples of a son learning from his father. In the first verse, the father and son are in the car together, driving through town. The son is eating a Happy Meal in the passenger seat, just as the father slams on the brakes at a red light, causing the boy to spill his food all over himself and say a bad word (implied to be shit). The father asks where his son learned to swear, and the boy then responds with "I've been watching you. / Dad, ain't that cool? / I'm your buckaroo, I wanna be like you."

In the second verse, the father heads out to his barn and begins to pray ("Lord, please help me help my stupid self.") Still later, at bedtime, the boy kneels beside his bed to pray as well, with his father watching. Upon hearing the boy's prayers, the father asks "Where'd you learn to pray like that?" to which the boy again responds by saying that he has been watching his father. The father then responds by hugging his son and stating his pride in the boy.

Music video
The video portrays the events which are laid out in the song's lyrics. Elijah also portrays the child in the song's video, and as a result, he has gained recognition in public. It was Atkins' second video directed by Eric Welch.

In popular culture
On the Comedy Central special with Natasha Leggero 'Diamond Pussy' (2015), she lampoons country music and specifically "Watching You"'s lyric: "Knowing that he couldn't have the toy 'til his nuggets were gone."

Charts

Year-end charts

Certifications

References

External links

2007 singles
2006 songs
Rodney Atkins songs
Billboard Hot Country Songs number-one singles of the year
Curb Records singles
Songs written by Rodney Atkins
Songs written by Steve Dean
Songs about fathers